There is a recap for the 2000–01 Venezuelan Professional Baseball League season ( or LVBP):

Regular season standings

Eastern Division

Western Division

(C)Classified to the Round Robin

Wild Card

(C)Classified to the Round Robin

Round robin

(C)Classified to the Championship series.

Championship series

Cardenales de Lara LVBP 2000-2001 Champions

Awards

Most Valuable Player (Víctor Davalillo Award): Chris Jones (La Guaira)

Overall Offensive Performer of the year: Chris Jones (La Guaira) and Alex Cabrera (Los Llanos)

Rookie of the year: Carlos Mendoza (La Guaira)

Comeback of the year: José Malavé (Oriente)

Pitcher of the year (Carrao Bracho Award): Edwin Hurtado (Lara)

Reliever of the year: José Solarte (Magallanes)

LVBP seasons